Radović is a common surname in Serbia, Montenegro, Bosnia and Herzegovina and Croatia. It is sometimes spelled Radovic in English and is related to the German version Radowitz, Romanian Radovici and Hungarian Radovics.

People whose last name is Radović
 Aleksandar Radović (disambiguation), multiple people
 Aleksandra Radović (born 1974), Serbian singer
 Andrija Radović (1872–1947), Montenegrin politician
Cristián Contreras Radovic (born 1969), Chilean journalist and politician
 Darinka Radović (1896–1943), activist for the Yugoslav Partisans and People's Hero of Yugoslavia
 Dragan Radović (born 1976), Montenegrin football player
 Duško Radović (1922–1984), Serbian journalist and writer
 Igor Radović (born 1978), Montenegrin football player
 Ilija Radović (born 1985), Montenegrin football player
 Lazar Radović (born 1937), Montenegrin football player
 Milan Radović (born 1952), Serbian football player
 Miodrag Radović (born 1957), Yugoslav football player
 Miroslav Radović (born 1984), Serbian football player
 Nikola Radović (1933–1991), Yugoslav football player
 Novica Radović (1890–1945), Montenegrin politician
 Vasilije Radović (born 1938), Yugoslav football player
 Velibor Radović (born 1972), Montenegrin-Israeli basketball player
 Vesna Radović (born 1954), Yugoslav-Austrian handball player
 Zeljko Radovic (Austrian footballer) (born 1974)
 Zoran Radović (born 1961), Serbian basketball player

See also
 Radovich

Serbian surnames
Patronymic surnames
Surnames from given names